Lardy may refer to:

 resembling or containing lard
 Lardy cake, British traditional rich spiced form of bread
 Lardy, Essonne, a commune in the Essonne department in Île-de-France in northern France
 Lardy (Paris RER), a railway station located in Lardy, Essonne

People
 Anaël Lardy (born 1987), French basketball player
 Henry A. Lardy (1917–2010), American biochemist and professor
 Philippe Lardy (born 1963), Swiss illustrator and painter

See also
 McLardy, surname